Up Your Alley is a 1989 romantic comedy film directed by Bob Logan and starring Linda Blair. The screenplay was by Logan and Murray Langston (better known as the Unknown Comic), who also co-stars.

Premise 
While pursuing a story on homelessness, an undercover reporter (Blair) finds romance with a transient (Langston).

Cast 
 Linda Blair as Vickie Adderly 
 Murray Langston as David  
 Ruth Buzzi as Marilyn 
 Bob Zany as Sonny Griffin

Release 
The film was released in the United States on April 1, 1989 and secured a VHS release on August 10, 1989.

References

External links 
 

1989 films
1989 romantic comedy films
American romantic comedy films
1989 directorial debut films
1980s English-language films
Films directed by Bob Logan
1980s American films